Bradford & Huddersfield (previously UTV-Bauer West Yorkshire) is a local commercial digital radio multiplex in the United Kingdom, which serves the West Yorkshire area. It is wholly owned by Bauer Radio after Wireless Group sold the multiplex in 2019 following the sale of Wireless local stations. Bradford & Huddersfield is transmitted on frequency block 11B from the Ainley Top (just north of Huddersfield), Keighley and Westgate Hill (on the A650 south-east of Bradford) transmitters.

The licence was first advertised on 18 May 2001 and was awarded by the Radio Authority on 4 October 2001 to TWG Digital, who were the only  applicant for the licence on the closing date of 21 August 2001. It then launched in September 2002. TWG Digital (part of The Wireless Group) became UTV-EMAP when TWG was bought by UTV in June 2005. EMAP was purchased by Bauer in 2008, changing the name to UTV-Bauer. Bauer changed the name to Bradford & Huddersfield in 2010. The main transmitter was to be Holme Moss, but Ainley Top was used instead. Westgate Hill is the most powerful signal of the three transmitters. The transmitters are twice as powerful as the nearby Bauer Leeds multiplex.

The Pulse of West Yorkshire, which is the main commercial station broadcasting to this area, is owned by Bauer Radio.

References

External links
 Awarding of licence on 4 October 2001 to TWG Digital
 Switch Digital information website
 Ainley Top
 Keighley

Digital audio broadcasting multiplexes
Radio stations in Yorkshire
Wireless Group